Keratsini-Drapetsona is a municipality in the Piraeus regional unit, Attica, Greece. The seat of the municipality is the town of Keratsini.

The municipality was formed at the 2011 local government reform by the merger of the following two former municipalities, Drapetsona and Keratsini, which became municipal units.

References

Municipalities of Attica
Populated places in Piraeus (regional unit)